Mauro Gavotto (born 16 April 1979 in Cuneo) is an Italian volleyball player. He finished 4th with his team at the 2008 Summer Olympics.
Gavotto in 2004, 2005 Serie A1 League Most Valuable Player.

References 
 

1979 births
Living people
People from Cuneo
Italian men's volleyball players
Olympic volleyball players of Italy
Volleyball players at the 2008 Summer Olympics
Sportspeople from the Province of Cuneo